Hunua may refer to the following in New Zealand:

 Hunua, a small settlement in the rural outskirts of south Auckland
 Hunua (New Zealand electorate)
 Hunua Ranges, a block of hilly country to the southeast of Auckland in the North Island